Franco-Moroccan Wars include:
Larache Expedition (1765)
French conquest of Algeria (1830–44)
Franco-Moroccan War (1844)
Bombardment of Salé (1851)
South-Oranese Campaign (1897–1903)
French conquest of Morocco (1907–34)
Zaian War (1914–21)
Rif War (1921–26)
Ifni War (1957–58)